Saeid Barkhordari (born 7 May 1989) is an Iranian handball player for AD Ciudad de Guadalajara and the Iranian national team.

References

External Links

1989 births
Living people
Iranian male handball players
Asian Games silver medalists for Iran
Asian Games medalists in handball
Handball players at the 2010 Asian Games
Medalists at the 2010 Asian Games
21st-century Iranian people